The Founding of a Party, alternatively titled in English Beginning of the Great Revival for its international release, is a Chinese propaganda film released in 2011 to mark the 90th anniversary of the Chinese Communist Party. The film is directed by Huang Jianxin and Han Sanping, both of whom also worked on the related film, The Founding of a Republic, which features a star-studded cast of Chinese actors, including Andy Lau and Chow Yun-fat. The film was created by the state-owned China Film Group and depicts the formation of the Chinese Communist Party, beginning with the fall of the Qing dynasty in 1911 and ending with the Party's founding congress in 1921.<ref>Chi-Chi Zhang. [http://www.startribune.com/entertainment/movies/123534789.html?page=all&prepage=1&c=y#continue 'China takes no chances on blockbuster status of star-filled propaganda film 'Great Revival], Associated Press, 9 June 2011</ref>

Plot
During the early 20th century, China is marked by political disunity and a handful of individuals, including Mao Zedong, Li Dazhao, and Zhou Enlai, envision a unified China, especially in the political crises that followed the 1911 Xinhai Revolution, which ended centuries of dynastic rule in the country. After World War I, the Western Allies gave Tsingtao and Kiaochow Bay to the Empire of Japan at the Treaty of Versailles, stirring sentiments amongst China's youth, leading to the May Fourth Movement of 1919. In March 1920, Grigori Voitinsky comes to China in an attempt to spread communism to the Far East and, on 22 July 1921, 13 representatives from throughout China meet in a Shanghai's women's dormitory to found what would become the Chinese Communist Party.

Cast

ProductionThe Founding of a Party was one of 28 films promoted by the State Administration of Radio, Film, and Television to mark the 90th anniversary of the Communist Party. Filming commenced on 18 August 2010 at the China Film Group Corporation's shooting location in Huairou District, Beijing.

Dubbed by the Western media as a "propaganda epic", the film has a final all-star cast, including celebrities from mainland China, Hong Kong, Taiwan, and other countries, who play the roles of various historical figures; a few notable actors include Andy Lau, Chow Yun-fat, Taiwanese-American singer Leehom Wang, Hong Kong film director John Woo, Taiwanese actor Chang Chen, Hong Kong actor Eric Tsang, mainland Chinese singer Han Geng and Russian singer Vitalii Vladasovich Grachyov (stage name Vitas). Liu Ye, who played a young Mao Zedong, was reported to have gained  to play his role, a feat achieved by eating 20 eggs a day. Media reports claim that over 400 actors auditioned for the film's roles.

During a news conference on 8 June 2011, the film's director Huang Jianxin said that the film would have several scenes cut, as the original film would have otherwise been too long for theatrical release. Among the cuts were actress Tang Wei's performance as Tao Yi, an early female partner of Mao Zedong. Some media reports claimed that Mao Zedong's grandson Mao Xinyu, a major-general in the People's Liberation Army, objected to her being inappropriate for the role (citing her earlier role in the erotic-thriller film Lust, Caution). A cinema group executive, however, alleged that unnamed "industry insiders" had questioned the factual accuracy of her character and denied the decision was related to Tang's role in Lust, Caution.

Production values have improved over Han Sanping's previous film The Founding of a Republic, with better-lit widescreen photography created by Zhao Xiaoshi. As with Republic, Party also features musical scores by Shu Nan. Some original black-and-white documentary footage included within the film. The film was also given an opportunity to shoot within the Moscow Kremlin.

Sponsorship
Shanghai GM, the Chinese joint venture of the American automotive giant General Motors, announced in September 2010 that its subsidiary Cadillac had become 'chief business partner' to the film. General Motors was hit by criticism upon revelations that it had sponsored the Chinese communist propaganda film.Picket, Kerry (blog, 17 May 2011). "GM sponsors and celebrates soon to be released Chi-Com propaganda film", The Washington Times General Motors said the sponsorship was a commercial alliance initiated by its Chinese joint venture and described it as "part of a strategic alignment with the film industry". The film group spokesman said Cadillac had signed a multi-year cooperation deal with the studio, not solely for the film.

Release
The premiere event of the film took place on 8 June in Beijing, prior to its official release on 15 June. According to Han Sanping, the film was shown abroad in over 10 countries, including the United States, Canada, Australia, South Korea and Singapore, and that the global version of the film finished editing on 8 June. The theme song of the film is titled One Day. The IMAX version of the film was screened in only a select 20 of the 24 IMAX theatres in China.16 June 2011, China turns all its attention to 'Beginning of the Great Revival', The Independent

The Chinese theatrical releases of Transformers: Dark of the Moon and Harry Potter and the Deathly Hallows – Part 2 were delayed until late July, possibly to ensure that The Founding of a Party received the maximum amount of attention possible.

The international (overseas) release featured the alternate title Beginning of the Great Revival and a different cut compared to the domestic China version, and was released in North America, Australia and New Zealand on 24 June 2011.

Reception
Two days after the box office release, the film's gross exceeded RMB 50 million, and there were reports that the majority of viewers were young people. However, The Christian Science Monitor reported that ticket sales were inflated by mass distribution of free tickets; staff were given time off from work to see the film. Schools and government offices had to buy large numbers of tickets. Box office takings have been inflated at the expense of popular films – many complicit cinemas manually altered computerised ticket stubs for the film, allowing the viewer to see other films."Beginning of a great film controversy", 7 July 2011, The Standard The Chinese media was not allowed to criticise the film.

A review by Derek Elley suggests that Han Sanping's idea of "selling" official anniversary films by cramming them full of celebrity cameos was not as successful in The Founding of a Party in comparison to his previous 2009 film The Founding of a Republic created to celebrate the 60th anniversary of the People's Republic of China, although the tactic still works to a lesser extent; he suggests that the use of star cameos was inherently less panoramic because the film plot is set within a smaller scope of a 10-year period, and that the concept of star cameos is "a tad less fresh". As with Republic, Party provides a strong "ooh-look! factor" due to its familiar faces; however, very few actors get a chance to build real performances in dramatic terms. He also praises the scene designs, referring to a sequence in Beijing as having a "fairytale atmosphere". Elley rates the film overall at 7 out of 10.

See also
 The Founding of a Republic''

References

External links
 
 
 
 

2011 films
Chinese historical films
Chinese propaganda films
Films directed by Huang Jianxin
Films set in the 1920s
2010s Mandarin-language films
DMG Entertainment films
China Film Group Corporation films
IMAX films
Cultural depictions of Mao Zedong
Cultural depictions of Zhou Enlai
Cultural depictions of Deng Xiaoping
Cultural depictions of Chiang Kai-shek
Cultural depictions of Sun Yat-sen
Cultural depictions of Vladimir Lenin